Felix Terry Finisterre  is a Saint Lucian citizen and a sustainable tourism consultant. He is a former teacher, having served at St Aloysius Roman Catholic Boys' School, Corinth Junior Secondary and Teachers' Training College, which was absorbed as the Teacher Training Division of the Sir Arthur Lewis Community College.

A Kellogg Fellow since 1989, Finisterre has worked with several local and regional development agencies, including the National Research & Development Foundation and Small Enterprise Assistance Project in Barbados. He was a Deputy Director of Tourism in the Saint Lucia Tourist Board, under then-Director Agnes Francis and then-Minister Romanus Lansiquot. Mr. Finisterre is the founding Director of the Saint Lucia Heritage Tourism Programme and of the Soufriere Regional Development Programme, which founded the Soufriere Marine Management Area.

Mr. Finisterre is a member of the Saint Lucia Labour Party, and won the Babonneau seat in the House of Assembly in 2001. He was appointed as Minister for Communications, Transportations, Works & Public Utilities  in the administration led by Prime Minister, Dr Kenny Davis Anthony. Finisterre lost the Babonneau seat in the General Elections of 2006.

He is head of the sub-regional office of the Caribbean Local Economic Development programme (CARILED), implemented by the Federation of Canadian Municipalities (FCM), in partnership with the Caribbean Forum of Local Government Ministers (CFLGM), the Caribbean Association of Local Government Authorities (CALGA) and the Commonwealth Local Government Forum (CLGF) and funded by the Canadian International Development Agency (CIDA).

References

Living people
Members of the House of Assembly of Saint Lucia
Saint Lucia Labour Party politicians
Year of birth missing (living people)